Farnley and Wortley is a ward in the metropolitan borough of the City of Leeds, West Yorkshire, England.  It contains 45 listed buildings that are recorded in the National Heritage List for England.  All the listed buildings are designated at Grade II, the lowest of the three grades, which is applied to "buildings of national importance and special interest".  The ward includes the area of Wortley a suburb to the west of the city centre of Leeds, and the area of  Farnley.  The latter is further to the west, and contains the former village of Farnley, the later village of New Farnley to the south, further to the south the settlement of Upper Moor Side, and the surrounding countryside.  Most of the listed buildings are houses, cottages and associated structures, farmhouses and farm buildings.  The other listed buildings include churches, the cupola of a previous church, surviving buildings of a former textile mill, a public house, schools, and a war memorial.


Buildings

References

Citations

Sources

 

Lists of listed buildings in West Yorkshire